Edward Lockley Tomkins (3 October 1920 – 12 August 1979) was an Australian rules footballer who played with Fitzroy in the Victorian Football League (VFL).

Notes

External links 		
		
		
		
		
		
		
		
1920 births		
1979 deaths		
Australian rules footballers from Victoria (Australia)		
Fitzroy Football Club players